Yana Yana (Aymara yana black,night, Quechua yana black, the reduplication indicates that there is a group or a complex of something, may be "a complex of black color") is a  mountain in the Wansu mountain range in the Andes of Peru. It is situated in the Arequipa Region, Condesuyos Province, Cayarani District, and in the La Unión Province, Puyca District. Yana Yana lies northeast of Janq'u Q'awa and southeast of Kunturi.

References 

Mountains of Peru
Mountains of Arequipa Region